The following is a list of some important Polish artists and groups of artists. 



A 
 Magdalena Abakanowicz (1930–2017), sculptor
 Julia Acker (1898–1942), painter
 Tadeusz Ajdukiewicz (1852–1916), painter
 Zygmunt Ajdukiewicz (1861–1917), painter
 Kazimierz Alchimowicz (1840–1916), painter
 Paweł Althamer (born 1967), sculptor, video art
 Teodor Axentowicz (1859–1938), painter

B 
 Marcello Bacciarelli (1731–1818), painter
 Ladislaus Bakalowicz (1831–1904), painter
 Mirosław Bałka (born 1958), sculptor
 Zdzisław Beksiński (1929–2005), painter
 Józef Bełch (1909–1993), painter
 Władysław T. Benda (1873–1948), painter, illustrator, designer
 Jan Betley (1908–1980), painter
 Paweł Bielec (1902–2002), photographer
 Krzysztof Boguszewski (died 1635), painter
 Władysław Borzęcki (1920–1998), sculptor
 Olga Boznańska (1865–1940), painter
 Józef Brandt (1841–1915), painter
 Tadeusz Breyer (1874–1952), sculptor and medallist
 Antoni Brodowski (1784–1832), painter
 Urszula Broll (1930–2020), painter
 Tadeusz Brzozowski (1918–1987), painter
 Joshua Budziszewski Benor (1950–2006), painter
 Alicja Buławka-Fankidejska (1983-), ceramist
 Franciszek Bunsch (1927–), painter, graphics artist

C
 Ignacy Julian Cejzyk (1779–1858), painter, photographer, and forger
Józef Charyton (1909–1975), painter
 Józef Chełmoński (1849–1905), painter
 Stanisław Chlebowski (1835–1884), painter
 Daniel Chodowiecki  (1726–1801), painter
 Leon Chwistek (1884–1944), painter
 Boleslaw Cybis (1895–1957), painter, sculptor, and muralist
 Władysław Czachorski (1850–1911), painter
 Józef Czajkowski (1872-1947), painter, architect, furniture designer, tapestries
 Józef Czapski (1896–1993), painter
 Szymon Czechowicz (1689–1775), painter
 Tytus Czyżewski (1880–1945), painter

D 
 Krystyna Dąbrowska (1906–1944), sculptor and painter
 Andrzej Dłużniewski (1939–2012), painter
 Tadeusz Dominik (1928–2014), painter
 Karl Duldig (1902–1986), Austrian-Australian sculptor, born in what is now Poland
 Xawery Dunikowski (1875–1964), sculptor and painter

F
 Julian Fałat (1853–1929), painter
 Wojciech Fangor (1922–2015), painter
 Samuel Finkelstein (1895–1942), painter

G 
 Wojciech Gerson (1831–1901), painter
 Stefan Gierowski (1925–2022), painter
 Aleksander Gierymski (1850–1901), painter
 Maksymilian Gierymski (1846–1874), painter
 Chaim Goldberg (1917–2004), painter, sculptor, engraver 
 Józef Gosławski (1908–1963), sculptor and medallist
 Henryk Gotlib (1890–1966), painter
 Maurycy Gottlieb (1856–1879), painter
 Artur Grottger (1837–1867), painter

H 
 Wladyslaw Hasior (1928–1999), sculptor
 George Him (1900–1982), designer and artist
 Joanna Hoffmann-Dietrich (born 1968), artist and academic
 Horak, Eugeniusz (1914–1972), painter and woodblock printmaker

I
 Marian Iwańciów (1906–1971), painter

J 
 Stanisław Jackowski (1887–1951), sculptor
 Jerzy Jarnuszkiewicz (1919–2005), sculptor
Renata Jaworska (born 1979), painter
 Krzysztof Jung (1951-1998), painter and installation artist

K 
 Rajmund Kanelba (1897–1960), painter
 Tadeusz Kantor (1915–1990), painter, theatre director
 Stanisława de Karłowska (1876–1952), painter
 Alfons Karpiński (1875–1961), painter
 Mojżesz Kisling (1891–1953), painter
 Raphaël Kleweta, (1949-2016), artist
 Stefan Knapp (1921–1996), painter, sculptor
 Marcin Kober (ca. 1550 – before 1598), painter
 Katarzyna Kobro (1898–1951), sculptor
 Helga Kohl (born 1943), photographer
 Urszula Kolaczkowska (1911–2009), textile artist
 Juliusz Kossak (1824–1899), painter
 Wojciech Kossak (1856–1942), painter
 Jerzy Kossak (1886–1955), painter
 Franciszek Kostrzewski (1826–1911), painter
 Aleksander Kotsis (1836–1877), painter
 Felicjan Kowarski (1890–1948), painter
 Konrad Krzyżanowski (1872–1922), painter
 Wlodzimierz Ksiazek (1951–2011), painter
 Alexander Kucharsky (1741–1819), painter
 Teofil Kwiatkowski (1809–1891), painter
 Jarosław Kozłowski (born 1945), conceptual artist

L 
 Małgorzata Turewicz Lafranchi (born 1961), contemporary artist
 Tamara de Lempicka (1898–1980), painter

M 
 Tadeusz Makowski (1882–1932), painter
 Jacek Malczewski (1854–1929), painter
 Rafał Malczewski (1892–1965), painter, cartoonist
 Władysław Malecki (1836–1900), painter
 Louis Marcoussis (1878–1941), painter
 Adam Marczyński (1908–1985), painter
 Stanisław Masłowski (1853–1926), painter
 Jan Matejko (1838–1893), painter
 Agata Materowicz (born 1962), painter
 Józef Mehoffer (1869–1946), painter
 Piotr Michałowski (1800–1855), painter
 Jacek Mierzejewski (1883–1925), painter
 Jerzy Mierzejewski (1917–2012), painter
 Augustyn Mirys (1700–1790), painter
 Igor Mitoraj (1944–2014), sculptor
 Eugeniusz Molski (born 1942), painter, sculptor

N
 Eligiusz Niewiadomski (1869–1923), painter
 Jan Piotr Norblin  (1745–1830), painter
 Zbigniew Nowosadzki (born 1957), painter
 Jerzy Nowosielski (1923–2011), painter

O
 Roman Opałka (1931–2011), painter
 Aleksander Orłowski (1777–1832), painter

P 
 Józef Pankiewicz (1866–1940), painter
 Jacek Papla (1951–), graphic artist and painter
 Urszula Plewka-Schmidt (1939–2008), tapestry artist
 Władysław Podkowiński (1866–1895), painter
 Peter Potworowski (1898–1962), painter
 Tadeusz Pruszkówski (1888–1942), painter
 Witold Pruszkówski (1846–1896), painter
 Stanislaw Przespolewski (1910–1989), painter, sculptor

R 
 Nathan Rapoport (1911–1987), sculptor
 Henryk Rodakowski (1823–1894), painter
 Zofia Romer (1885–1972), painter
 Moshe Rynecki (1881-1943), painter
 Ferdynand Ruszczyc (1870–1936), painter

S 
 Stanisław Samostrzelnik (c. 1490–1541), painter
 Wilhelm Sasnal (born 1972), painter
 Jan Sawka (1946–2012), painter, sculptor, printmaker, stage and set design
 Bruno Schulz (1892–1942), painter
 Maria Seyda (1893–1989), portrait painter
 Henryk Siemiradzki (1843–1902), painter
 Józef Simmler (1823–1868), painter
 Wojciech Siudmak (born 1942), painter
 Władysław Ślewiński (1856–1918), painter
 Franciszek Smuglewicz (1745–1807), painter
 Anna Sobol-Wejman (born 1946), printmaker
 Aleksander A Sochaczewski (1843–1923), painter
 Kajetan Sosnowski (1913–1987), painter
 Jan Stanisławski (1860–1907), painter
 Jan Byk Franciszek Starowieyski (1930–2009), painter
 Henryk Stażewski (1894–1988), painter
 Ludwik Stasiak (1858–1924), painter
 Abraham Straski (1903–1987), painter
 Władysław Strzemiński (1893–1952), painter
 Jan Styka (1858–1925), painter
 January Suchodolski (1797–1875), painter
 Józef Szajna (1922–2008), sculptor, scenography designer, theatre director
 Alina Szapocznikow (1926–1973), sculptor
 Zofia Szeptycka (1837–1904), painter, poet
 Arthur Szyk (1894–1951), painter of illuminated miniatures, book illustrator
 Stanisław Szukalski (1893–1987), painter and sculptor
 Andrzej Szewczyk (1950–2001), painter, conceptual artist

T 
 Włodzimierz Tetmajer (1861–1923), painter
 Feliks Topolski (1907–1989), painter, draughtsman
 Czesław Tumielewicz (born 1942), painter

U 
 Piotr Uklański (born 1968), painter, installation artist
 Marian Ulc (born 1947), sculptor

W 
 Zygmunt Waliszewski (1897–1936), painter
 Walenty Wańkowicz (1799–1842), painter
 Wojciech Weiss (1875–1950), painter
 Aleksander Werner (1920–2011), painter, sculptor
 Jan de Weryha-Wysoczański (born 1950), sculptor
 Katerina Wilczynski (1894–1978), painter and illustrator
 Stanisław Witkiewicz (1851–1915)
 Stanisław Ignacy Witkiewicz a.k.a. "Witkacy" (1885–1939)
 Krzysztof Wodiczko (born 1943), installation artist
 Witold Wojtkiewicz  (1879–1909), painter
 Andrzej Wróblewski (1927–1957), painter
 Leon Wyczółkowski (1852–1936), painter
 Stanisław Wyspiański (1869–1907), painter

Y
 Jacek Yerka (born 1952), painter

Ż 
 Marcin Zaleski (1796–1877), painter
 Franciszek Żmurko (1859–1910), painter
 Marek Żuławski (1908–1985), painter

See also 
 List of Poles
 List of Polish painters
 List of Polish contemporary artists

References 

 
Polish
Artists